Council Rock High School North is a high school located in Newtown, Bucks County, Pennsylvania. It is a part of the Council Rock School District. The school is located across from Newtown Middle School and Tyler State Park, and near Bucks County Community College. The current student population is 1,588 for grades 9–12.

The school is three stories tall and is divided into an East wing and a West wing. Until 2006, there was no direct connection between the third floors on each wing, so students and staff had to use hallways on the first or second floor to cross between wings.

When originally constructed, the school was the only high school in the district and was known simply as "Council Rock High School". As the local population continued to grow, a new high school (Council Rock High School South) was built in Holland, Pennsylvania, which opened in the fall of 2002, and "North" was added to the original school's name. When the new school was opened, middle schools were re-districted as follows: Holland Middle School students attend Council Rock South, Newtown Middle School students and the now closed Richboro Middle School students attend Council Rock North.

The school colors are navy blue, white, and silver, and the school sports teams are known as the Council Rock Indians. After the split in 2002, silver was given to North and gold given to South to distinguish them while still maintaining the two traditional colors of the original high school.

The school and the school district are named for Council Rock (also known as Indian Rock), a rock outcropping that forms a cliff in Tyler State Park. This rock was once a council rock for Lenape Indians living in the area.

Academics 

In 2021 U.S. News & World Report ranked Council Rock High School North 33rd within Pennsylvania and 1,030th nationally among high schools.

Council Rock High School North offers 19 Advanced Placement courses. The Advanced Placement participation rate at the school is 48%. Council Rock North is known as one of the top tier public schools in the Bucks County Region.

Of the 2009 graduates, ten were named valedictorians, 17 were named National Merit Semi-Finalists (outscoring 99.5% of all PSAT test-takers), 20 were named National Merit Commended students, and all 17 semi-finalists attained finalist status. In the 2008–09 school year, 45 students were named Advanced Placement Scholars. SAT scores routinely exceed the national and state averages; Critical Reading, Writing and Math average scores were 550, 546 and 568, respectively. The difference, for all three sections combined, in national average SAT scores and Council Rock North student average SAT scores is 163 points.

Philadelphia magazine recognized Council Rock High School North as one of the top schools in the Philadelphia Metropolitan Area; Council Rock High Schools were the only high schools in Bucks County named to the "50 Best Schools List" (2004). Council Rock High School North ranked as the top public school in Bucks County in 2005, 2006, and 2008. Newsweek ranked Council Rock High School North as one of America's top schools in 2007. Mid-Atlantic Construction magazine recognized Council Rock North's renovations as the "Project of the Year" in the K–12 category.

Extra Curricular Activities 

 Future Business Leaders of America- 10th largest chapter of PA FBLA in the 2021-2022 school year
 Speech and Debate- ranked a top 100 team in the nation  
 National Honor Society- school also has other Honor Societies like French Honor Society, Spanish Honor Society, Rho Kappa, Tri-M, National Business Honor Society, National Art Honor Society, National English Honor Society, and more
 Rock Ambassadors- organization that tours and mentors freshmen and new students
 Indianite- school newspaper 
 Asian Student Association
 Black Student Union
 Ski and Snowboard club 
 E3- club that encourages young girls to participate in STEM
 Sock and Buskin- theatre group
 Orchestra
 Marching Band 
 Mindful Living

Athletics 

Council Rock High School North sports teams have won multiple local and state championships. Rivalries include sister school Council Rock South.

 Baseball/Softball The 2007 and 2009 Baseball varsity team made it to the quarterfinals of the PA state tournament.
 Basketball The Men's Basketball team has won 12 Conference Championships. The 2010-11 team won a school record 27 games and finished the season ranked regionally by ESPN and USA Today.
 Bowling
 Cheerleading
 Cross Country: The 2008 women's team went undefeated. The Varsity team took 7th at the PIAA State Championships, and the Junior Varsity team won both the league and district. The Varsity men's team took 6th at the PIAA State Championships. The men's Cross Country team has won 11 state titles.
 Football: The 2006 varsity football team had an undefeated regular season. The team has beaten their rivals, Council Rock South 2 years and a row
 Field Hockey
 Golf
 Ice hockey
 Lacrosse
 Soccer: Council Rock North Men's Soccer was ranked 3rd in the nation on espnrise.com during the 2009 season for over three weeks. In 2006, the Men's Varsity Soccer team won the PIAA championship.
 Softball
 Swimming: As of 2020, the women's team has been undefeated in the SOL Championships for 12 consecutive years, whereas the men's team has been undefeated for 4 years. 
 Tennis: Men's (spring) and Women's (fall)
 Track
 Volleyball
 Wrestling

Notable alumni 

Brent Billingsley - Major League Baseball Player 1996–2005. Florida Marlins, Montreal Expos, Colorado Rockies, Philadelphia Phillies
Brandon Cottom - professional football player
Jillian Parry Fry - 2000 Miss Teen USA
James C. Greenwood - former federal Congressman representing 8th District of Pennsylvania, which includes entire Council Rock School District
Anthony Green - lead singer of band Circa Survive; also involved with many bands originating in Philadelphia area
Paul Guenther - former defensive coordinator of NFL's Las Vegas Raiders and Cincinnati Bengals
Ro Khanna - Member of the U.S. House of Representatives from California's 17th district
Ryan Lexer (born 1976) - American-Israeli basketball player
Shwa Losben - singer/songwriter
Laura Owen - businesswoman and former Kansas Secretary of Commerce
Gina Sicilia - singer/songwriter
Dennis Woodside - President, Impossible Foods; former COO, Dropbox; former CEO, Motorola Mobility
Jay Wright - former basketball head coach, Villanova

References

External links
Official site
Rock North Runners

Public high schools in Pennsylvania
Educational institutions established in 1970
Schools in Bucks County, Pennsylvania
1970 establishments in Pennsylvania